Önder Karaveli (born 26 March 1974) is a Turkish football coach and former player, who most recently managed Adanaspor.

Honours

Manager
Beşiktaş
Turkish Super Cup: 2021

Managerial statistics

References

External links

 

1974 births
Living people
Footballers from Istanbul
Association football midfielders
Turkish football managers
Süper Lig managers
Beşiktaş J.K. managers
Fatih Karagümrük S.K. managers
Adanaspor managers